Manchanahalli Rangaswamy Satyanarayana Rao known by the abbreviation M. R. S. Rao (born 21 January 1948 at Mysore, India), is an Indian scientist. He has been awarded the fourth highest civilian award Padma Shri in Science and Engineering category (year 2010) by the Government of India. He was the President of Jawaharlal Nehru Centre for Advanced Scientific Research (JNCASR) in Bangalore, India (2003-2013).

Education and personal life
Rao obtained his bachelor's degree (BSc) in 1966 and master's degree (MSc) in 1968 from Bangalore University. He received his PhD in biochemistry from Indian Institute of Science (IISc), Bangalore in 1973. Govindarajan Padmanabhan (Former Director, IISc) was his doctoral advisor at Department of Biochemistry. He did his postdoctoral research at Baylor College of Medicine, Houston, Texas, USA, (1974–76) and was as assistant professor at the same institution. He decided to come back to India and joined Department of Biochemistry, Indian Institute of Science (IISc).

At present, he is an Honorary Professor at Jawaharlal Nehru Centre for Advanced Scientific Research (JNCASR), Bangalore and actively running Chromatin Biology laboratory. He has been credited as first scientist to initiate Chromatin Biology research in India. In more than 30 years of active research career, his lab at IISc and JNCASR, has mentored more than 35 PhD students, dozens of Postdoctoral fellows and hundreds of research trainees.

Rao is married to Padma S. Rao and the couple has two sons, M. S. Sharat and M. S. Rohan, both engineers by profession. The happy family lives in Bangalore.

Professional life

After having his postdoctoral research and short stint of assistant professorship at Baylor College of Medicine, US, he returned to India in 1978 and joined the Department of Biochemistry, IISc as assistant professor. He was promoted to associate professor in 1987 and professor in 1991. He was the chairman of Centre for Genetic Engineering, IISc between 1990–93. For several occasions, he served as visiting professor to Baylor College of Medicine (in 1983 and 1986), Harvard Medical School (1988-90, and again in 1993), Ludwig Institute for Cancer Research and University of California at San Diego, USA (1998).

In 2003, he accepted the chair of President of Jawaharlal Nehru Centre for Advanced Scientific Research (JNCASR), Jakkur, Bangalore. He was the chairperson of Department of Biochemistry, IISc (1998–2003) and Molecular Biology and Genetics Unit (MBGU, JNCASR) between 2005–09. He has served as President of Society of Biological Chemists (India) for two terms between 2000–04. M.R.S. Rao has been associated as a governing body member or as a scientific advisor to several research institutes in India. He is the Ex-Chairman of Board of Governors of Indian Institute of Science Education and Research, Thiruvananthapuram, Kerala. He was a member of the Board of Governors of Indian Institute of Science Education and Research, Kolkata, Chairman, Research Council of Indian Institute of Chemical Biology, Kolkata, and Member, Selection/Search Committee of CSIR Directors.
 
He has served as chairperson or expert member of several scientific councils such as Department of Science and Technology, Department of Biotechnology (DBT), Council of Scientific and Industrial Research (CSIR), Indian Council of Medical Research (ICMR); Science academies such as Indian Academy of Sciences (IAS), National Academy of Sciences, India (NASI), Indian National Science Academy (INSA), Third World Academy of Sciences (TWAS) in Trieste, Italy and science policy making committees in Government of India organisations, Institutions and Universities in India. He is also active member of Third World Academy of Sciences (TWAS) activities. He is the chairperson of Task Force on Human Genetics & Genome Analysis of Department of Biotechnology, (DBT) India. He is member of Governing body of Institute of Bioinformatics and Applied Biotechnology (IBAB), Bangalore. He is also serving as member of academic council of Poornaprajna Institute of Scientific Research, Bangalore.

Rao has been appointed as a member in the newly constituted National Science and Engineering Research Board (SERB) which will support innovation, research and development in various sciences in India.

He is on the editorial board of several high repute peer reviewed journals and recently has joined as senior member on the editorial board of American Journal of Cancer Research (AJCR).

Publications
Rao is a prolific scientific researcher and author of hundreds of peer reviewed international journal articles. Several research articles have been cited extensively throughout the world scientific community. Most of his research work has been  focused on Chromatin biology and Cancer biology.

Rao has an h-index of above 26 (as per June 2011) and it's still in logarithmic phase and heading up continuously. One of his publication over colon cancer, published in Cell (journal) has extensive citations of more than 2000 so far.

Awards and recognitions
Rao has received several medals, awards and fellowships both in India and overseas. He has been awarded the Padma Shri (year 2010) by Government of India for his immense contribution in Science and Engineering to the country. He has received the coveted Shanti Swarup Bhatnagar Prize for Science and Technology (Year 1988) from the Council of Scientific and Industrial Research (CSIR), the Dr. B. R. Ambedkar Centenary Award from the Indian Council of Medical Research (2005), the Jawaharlal Nehru Birth Centenary Lecture award of the Indian National Science Academy (INSA), the FICCI Award, the J. C. Bose Medal of INSA, a Rockefeller Foundation Biotechnology Fellowship, the Om Prakash Bhasin Award, the Third World Academy of Sciences (TWAS) Medal Lecture Award 2008, the Ranbaxy Science Foundation Award for Basic Medical Sciences, and the Sir M. Visveswaraiah Senior Scientist State award from the Government of Karnataka. He received the Prof. N. Appaji Rao Best Mentor Award, 2011, an award instituted by the Indian Institute of Science Alumni Association (IIScAA), Bangalore.

He is a fellow of the Indian Academy of Sciences (IAS), Bangalore; the Indian National Science Academy (INSA), Delhi; the National Academy of Sciences, India (NASI), Allahabad; the National Academy of Medical Sciences (FAMS), India; the Third World Academy of Science (TWAS), Trieste, Italy; the American Society for Cell Biology, the American Society for Microbiology, the American Society for Biochemistry and Molecular Biology and the Human Genome Organization.

References

External links

1948 births
Living people
Recipients of the Padma Shri in science & engineering
Recipients of the Shanti Swarup Bhatnagar Prize for Science and Technology
Bangalore University alumni
Indian Institute of Science alumni
Academic staff of the Indian Institute of Science
Scientists from Bangalore
Fellows of the Indian National Science Academy
Fellows of the Indian Academy of Sciences
Fellows of The National Academy of Sciences, India
Fellows of the National Academy of Medical Sciences
20th-century Indian chemists
Scientists from Mysore
Indian biochemists
Recipients of the Shanti Swarup Bhatnagar Award in Biological Science